Shoal Creek is a stream in southeastern Crawford County in the U.S. state of Missouri. It is a tributary of Huzzah Creek.

The stream headwaters arise in the southeast corner of Crawford County just west of Missouri Route Y and only about two miles north of the mine at Viburnum in the northwest corner of Iron County. The stream flows north to north-northwest to its confluence with Huzzah Creek just south of Huzzah.

Shoal Creek was named for the fact it is flat and shallow like a shoal.

See also
List of rivers of Missouri
Shoal Creek (disambiguation)

References

Rivers of Crawford County, Missouri
Rivers of Missouri